Hard Luck is a ghost town in Gladwin County in the U.S. state of Michigan.

The settlement was involved in the lumber trade.

It had a station along the Michigan Central Railroad and contained its own post office briefly from April 24, 1904 until August 31, 1906.

References

Unincorporated communities in Michigan
Unincorporated communities in Gladwin County, Michigan
Former populated places in Gladwin County, Michigan
Ghost towns in Michigan
Logging communities in the United States